Gara Isa Khan is a town and union council of Dera Ismail Khan District in Khyber Pakhtunkhwa province of Pakistan. It has an altitude of 186 metres (613 feet).

References

Union councils of Dera Ismail Khan District
Populated places in Dera Ismail Khan District